Musica Sacra may refer to
 Musica Sacra (Cambridge), a mixed chorus in Cambridge, Massachusetts, United States
 Musica sacra (magazine), a German magazine for Catholic church music 
 Musica Sacra (New York), a mixed chorus in New York City, United States
 Musica Sacra (Warsaw), a mixed chorus devoted to sacred music in Warsaw, Poland